Busengo is one of the nineteen sectors (imirenge) in Gakenke District, in the Northern Province of Rwanda.

Location
Cyabingo lies to the north of Busengo. Kivuruga lies to the north-east. Gakenke Town lies to the south-east. Janja lies to the south, and Rusasa lies to the west of Busengo. The geographical coordinates of Busengo, Rwanda are 01°40'13.0"S, 29°39'52.0"E (Latitude:-1.670278; Longitude:29.664444).

Overview
Busengo is the location of Busengo Maternity Unit, built in 2013, with assistance of the Deerfield Foundation, based in New York City.

Also located here is the Lycee Polytechnique de Busengo, a public vocational school, administered by the Rwanda Ministry of Education.

References 

Populated places in Rwanda
Northern Province, Rwanda